Urban Chipmunk was the first country album by Alvin and the Chipmunks, released on February 4, 1981. The title parodies the 1980 movie Urban Cowboy.

Track listing

Original 1981 release

Urban Chipmunk was released on CD in 1993. For this release, the songs "Luckenbach, Texas (Back to the Basics of Love)" and "Made For Each Other" were deleted and replaced with new songs "The Devil Went Down to Georgia" and "Boot Scootin' Boogie". In addition, "I Love a Rainy Night" was retitled "I Love a Rainy Night (Saturday Morning Remix)" with new dialogue added. The cover art was also modified to feature the current character redesign.

1993 CD remaster

Charts and certifications 
Despite mixed reviews, the album ended up earning a Gold certification from the RIAA, the Chipmunks' second Gold album following 1980's Chipmunk Punk.

On the Billboard Top LPs chart, the record peaked at No. 56, while on the country chart, it reached No. 23.

Personnel
 Ross Bagdasarian Jr. — lead vocals (Alvin, Simon, David Seville)
 Janice Karman — lead vocals (Theodore)
 Buzz Cason — background vocals
 Bergen White — background vocals
 Dennis Wilson — background vocals
 Bob ”King” Moore — bass
 Jerry Carrigan — drums
 Hargus "Pig" Robbins — pedal steel guitars
 Rick Carlson – keyboards and piano
 Ray Edenton — rhythm guitars
 Billy Sanford — auxiliary percussion
 Jimmy Capps — rhythm guitars
 Leon Rhodes — lead guitar
 Buddy Spicher — fiddle

Production crew
 Ross Bagdasarian Jr — producer
 Janice Karman — producer
 Larry Butler — producer
 Billy Sherill — engineer
 Dain & DeJoy — album coordination
 Rick Detorie — art direction and illustrations
 David Foster — project consultant
 John Boylan — project consultant

References

Alvin and the Chipmunks albums
1981 albums
Albums produced by Larry Butler (producer)